The 2013–14 season was the 112th season of competitive football in Italy.

Promotions and relegations (pre-season)
Teams promoted to Serie A
 Sassuolo
 Hellas Verona
 Livorno

Teams relegated from Serie A
 Pescara
 Siena
 Palermo

Teams promoted to Serie B
 Trapani
 Carpi
 Latina
 Avellino

Teams relegated from Serie B
 Vicenza
 Ascoli
 Pro Vercelli
 Grosseto

League tables

Serie A

Serie B

References

 
Seasons in Italian football
2013 in Italian sport
2013 in association football
2014 in Italian sport
2014 in association football